Tom Chatto (born Thomas Chatto St George Sproule; 1 September 1920 – 8 August 1982) was an English actor who made numerous appearances on television, film, and stage between 1957 and his death in 1982.

Early life and career
Chatto is a great-grandson of Andrew Chatto (1840–1913) the founder of the publishers Chatto and Windus.

According to a London Palladium souvenir brochure from a 1970 production of Aladdin, he was trained at the Royal Academy of Dramatic Art. During the war he was commissioned in the Indian Army.  After the war he maintained the family interest in books and became a director of the firm of booksellers Pickering and Chatto.

Chatto appeared mostly in films, including Oscar Wilde (1960) in which he played the Clerk of Arraigns. He was well known for his role in the 1969 Guy Hamilton film Battle of Britain.

His work in the theatre includes Fings Ain't Wot They Used T'Be, My Fair Lady, Number 10, The Young Visiters and Hushabye. In 1969 he appeared with Tommy Steele and Mary Hopkin in Dick Whittington at The London Palladium and in 1970 was The Emperor of China in Aladdin with Cilla Black, Alfred Marks and Leslie Crowther, and with Alec Guinness in the play Time out of Mind. 

He appeared on TV in Honey Lane, The Cedar Tree, The Expert, and Happy Ever After. He had a minor role in the pilot episode of Randall and Hopkirk (Deceased) in 1969 in the episode, "My Late Lamented Friend and Partner".

Marriage
Chatto married Rosalind Joan Thompson, who became a successful talent agent under the name Ros Chatto (died 5 June 2012); the couple had two sons: 
James Chatto whose child is the stand-up comedian Mae Martin.
Daniel Chatto who married Lady Sarah Armstrong-Jones, the daughter of Princess Margaret, Countess of Snowdon and Anthony Armstrong-Jones, 1st Earl of Snowdon, and the niece of Queen Elizabeth II.

Filmography

References

External links

1920 births
1982 deaths
English male film actors
Tom
Alumni of RADA
20th-century English male actors
People from Elstree
Indian Army personnel of World War II
British Indian Army officers